The 2015 Judo World Masters was held in Rabat, Morocco, from 23 to 24 May 2015.

Medal summary

Medal table

Men's events

Women's events

References

External links
 

IJF World Masters
World Masters
Judo
Judo in Morocco
Judo
Judo